= SDIO =

SDIO may refer to:

- Secure Digital Input Output, a type of Secure Digital card interface. It can be used as an interface for input or output devices.
- Strategic Defense Initiative Organization, an organization set up to oversee the Strategic Defense Initiative; now known as the Missile Defense Agency.
